Irene Reid (born 1940 or 1941) is a British lollipop lady who was made a Member of the Most Excellent Order of the British Empire by Elizabeth II, in 2012.

In 2017, she was the UK's longest serving crossing patroller.

Career 
Reid worked as a lollipop lady in Longridge, Ribble Valley, covering the school crossing on Berry Lane, earning her a 2003 award for The Golden Jubilee Lollipop Person of the year. She was later in 2012 awarded a Member of the Most Excellent Order of the British Empire by Elizabeth II for her services to road safety. In 2012, she was the  longest-serving lollipop lady in Lancashire. By 2017, she was the UK's longest serving crossing patroller. She has been outspoken about crosswalk safety for children, openly criticising plans by Lancashire County Council in 2014 to reduce funding for crosswalk patrols.

By 2021, she had been working as a lollipop lady for 53 years. Reid also worked with the Longridge Youth and Community Centre for a decade.

Personal life 
, Reid lived in Ribble Valley and was aged 81. By 2019, she had four children, including a daughter, Angela, six grandchildren, and seven great-grandchildren.

She appeared on the British television game show Blankety Blank in 2021.

References 

Road safety in the United Kingdom
1940s births
Living people
People from Longridge
People from Ribble Valley (district)
Members of the Order of the British Empire